New Explorations into Science, Technology and Math, abbreviated NEST+M, is a public school located on the Lower East Side of the Manhattan borough of New York City, New York, and is under the supervision of the New York City Department of Education, serving grades kindergarten through 12th grade (the only K-12 public school in Manhattan).

The school exclusively enrolls New York City resident K–3 children scoring within the 97th, 98th, or 99th percentile of the gifted and talented test and sixth-graders at the 97th percentile nationwide in standardized tests administered by the New York City Department of Education for their Gifted & Talented Program. It is one of only five such New York citywide programs where qualified elementary or middle school students from any school district in any borough may enroll, and also the only program with a dedicated facility (the other four programs share schools with the general education student population) and the only program serving grades K through 12.

Prospective 9th and 10th-grade students apply through the NYC High School Application Process as well as their entrance exam. As of September 2017, Principal Mark Berkowitz eliminated the NEST+m entrance exam and published the new rubric on the NEST+m website. Current admissions process requires the combination of the average course grades from 7th and 8th- worth 50% total -and two essays- also worth 50% - for a total rated score out of 400. This year the cutoff for admission was a 390. The current acceptance rate for NEST+m Upper Grades is 1.3%, receiving approximately 6700 applications and 88 seats. The acceptance rate for transfer students is even lower due to the limited number of seats, this year the acceptance rate was less than 1%, for a total of 5 seats offered. 

NEST+m is one of the five gifted and talented schools. These five G&T schools are established as a gifted and talented school league. There are no gifted and talented high schools (that serve only 9-12), and instead they are called Specialized High Schools. The general movement for accelerated students: attend one of the five gifted and talented schools then attend a specialized high school or Hunter College High School. Nearly 30% of NEST+m 8th graders were accepted to Stuyvesant High School and another 30% were accepted to Brooklyn Technical High School. The other 10% were accepted to Bronx Science, HSMSE, and other specialized high schools.

In April 2020, Principal Mark Berkowitz resigned and accepted a position as Principal at Pelham Memorial High School located in Pelham, NY. Meaghan Lynch became the interim acting principal on July 1, 2020.


Notable alumni 
 Hudson Yang—actor

See also

 List of high schools in New York City
 List of public elementary schools in New York City

References

External links 
NEST+m at NYCDOE

Lower East Side
Public elementary schools in Manhattan
Public high schools in Manhattan
Public middle schools in Manhattan
Public K-12 schools in the United States
K-12 schools in Manhattan